Bulbillomyces is a fungal genus in the family Meruliaceae. Bulbillomyces is monotypic, containing the single species Bulbillomyces farinosus, a crust fungus. The genus was circumscribed by Swiss mycologist Walter Jülich in 1974. The fungus was reported as new to Japan in 2002.

References

External links

Fungi described in 1974
Fungi of Japan
Meruliaceae
Monotypic Polyporales genera